Andrew Thomson is a New Zealand born UN doctor and co-author of the international best seller "Emergency Sex and Other Desperate Measures"

Graduating top of his year from Auckland School of Medicine in 1983, Thomson has dedicated his life to humanitarian aid. He has worked as a medical officer in the UN in New York, Cambodia and Haiti. He has also worked with the international criminal tribunals for the former Yugoslavia and for Rwanda. His main work was in exhuming mass graves to gather forensic evidence to prosecute government officials.

Thomson's interest in humanitarian work came about when he was a medical student at the University of Auckland where he befriended Vary a Cambodian student who was one of the 60 doctors who survived the notorious killing fields.

"Emergency Sex" was published in October 2004 in a shroud of controversy as officials as high up as Kofi Annan tried to stop the book from being published. Thomson was sacked for his role in the book but with the help of the Government Accountability Project, a whistleblower's association, Thomson was reinstated and promoted.

The book has been optioned for television. Randall Wallace, script writer for Braveheart, is working on the screen play.

In 2006 Thomson received a Distinguished Alumni Award from the University of Auckland.

Thomson is currently a Senior Medical officer with the UN but is currently living in Cambodia with his wife and daughter.

Quotes
There's a life-size plaster statue of the Virgin just behind the altar. She has a machete slash across her breast and someone has tried to glue her torso back together.  She didn't get any more protection during the hacking orgy than anyone else, just got in the way, I guess. - The Skeleton Priest, from Emergency Sex.
If blue helmeted UN peacekeepers show up in your town or village and offer to protect you, run. Or else get weapons. Your lives are worth so much less than theirs.

External links
  New Yorker
  Transcript of Andrew Thomson's appearance on Australian talk show Enough Rope with Andrew Denton, 4 April 2005
  Andrew Thomson's Alumni Profile at his Alma Mater, the University of Auckland, New Zealand
  'UN Issues Groundbreaking Whistleblower Policy' - Press Release from GAP (Government Accountability Project), released 20 December 2005

Living people
New Zealand medical administrators
University of Auckland alumni
Year of birth missing (living people)